The 1991 Survivor Series was the fifth annual Survivor Series professional wrestling pay-per-view (PPV) event produced by the World Wrestling Federation. It took place on Thanksgiving Eve on November 27, 1991, at the Joe Louis Arena in Detroit, Michigan. It was the first Survivor Series to feature a singles match of any kind, where The Undertaker defeated Hulk Hogan to win the WWF World Heavyweight Championship.

Production

Background
Survivor Series is an annual gimmick pay-per-view (PPV), produced every November by the World Wrestling Federation (WWF, now WWE) since 1987. In what has become the second longest running pay-per-view event in history (behind WWE's WrestleMania), it is one of the promotion's original four pay-per-views, along with WrestleMania, Royal Rumble, and SummerSlam, which were dubbed the "Big Four". The event is traditionally characterized by having Survivor Series matches, which are tag team elimination matches. The 1991 event was the fifth event in the Survivor Series chronology. It was the first event in which all of the matches were not scheduled as Survivor Series matches. The event included four Survivor Series matches. The only non-Survivor Series match on the card was for the WWF World Heavyweight Championship, which was the first time it was defended at a Survivor Series. The event was scheduled to be held on Thanksgiving Eve on November 27, 1991, at the Joe Louis Arena in Detroit, Michigan.

Storylines
Ric Flair arrived in the World Wrestling Federation on September 9, 1991 claiming to be the “Real World's Champion”. He debuted carrying the WCW title with him, which he never lost. He immediately began feuding with Roddy Piper. Both men would captain their teams at Survivor Series. Piper had Bret Hart, The British Bulldog, and Virgil while Flair had Ted DiBiase, The Mountie, and The Warlord. There were multiple storylines between the two teams as DiBiase and Virgil traded the million dollar championship since the previous pay per view event, The Mountie was after Bret Hart’s intercontinental championship, and the Warlord and The British Bulldog were currently feuding and would go to be scheduled for the following WrestleMania (although that match would not happen). 

Hulk Hogan reclaimed the World Wrestling Federation Championship at Wrestlemania 7. The Undertaker debuted in the World Wrestling Federation at the previous year’s Survivor Series. Since debuting, Undertaker had yet to be pinned in a televised match (although he did suffer several a handful of pinfall losses at untelevised arena shows). This earned him a shot at Hogan championship billing the match as Hogan’s “Gravest Challenge.” 

Sid Justice was originally scheduled to join the Big Bossman and The Legion of Doom while Jake Roberts was originally scheduled to join IRS and The Natural Disasters. Sid Justice was sidelined due to an elbow injury. Macho Man Randy Savage was campaigning to take Sid’s place due to an issue with Roberts showing up to Randy’s wedding with a cobra snake. Savage would have to be reinstated due to losing at to Ultimate Warrior in a “career match” at WrestleMania 7. At a television taping for WWF Superstars of Wrestling (which would air November 23), Roberts baited Savage into the ring where he would unleash his king cobra snake on Savage. Savage would not be reinstated for the match and Roberts also not be allowed to compete in the match due to his actions.

The Hogan-Undertaker and Savage-Roberts feuds would continue to build toward the WWF's next pay-per-view event, "This Tuesday in Texas."

Aftermath
Due to Ric Flair's involvement in the events leading to The Undertaker's WWF World Heavyweight Championship victory over Hulk Hogan, a rematch was immediately signed for the This Tuesday in Texas pay-per-view event, contested December 3 at the Freeman Coliseum in San Antonio, Texas. WWF president Jack Tunney was present at ringside to make sure there was no outside interference. During the match, Flair once again attempted to interfere on The Undertaker's behalf, but – in a chaotic series of events that saw Tunney get knocked out – Hogan was able to pin The Undertaker after throwing ash from manager Paul Bearer's urn in his eyes. The following weekend, Jack Tunney vacated the WWF Championship due to the controversial finishes of the last two matches between Hogan and Undertaker, and put the title up for grabs at the 1992 Royal Rumble. Meanwhile, Hogan and Flair began wrestling in a series of matches that had been highly anticipated since the late 1980s.

Dissension had been brewing for weeks between Shawn Michaels and Marty Jannetty of the Rockers, and at their Survivor Series match the two argued after Jannetty caused Michaels to be eliminated by accidentally slamming one of the Nasty Boys into him. In a segment of Brutus "the Barber" Beefcake's "Barber Shop" talk show segment taped December 2 and aired on January 12, the two aired their grievances before seemingly resolving to stick together and work through their difficulties. However, Michaels superkicked Jannetty and threw him through a plate-glass window that was part of Beefcake's set, cementing Michaels' heel turn. A feud was commissioned, but Jannetty was fired in January 1992, shortly before their first match was to take place; the two eventually met in a series of matches in 1993, when Jannetty returned. However, for Michaels, the "Barber Shop" segment and the superkick jumpstarted his career that would continue to grow during the 1990s and 2000s.

Results

Survivor Series elimination matches

Other on-screen personnel

References

hoffco-inc.com – Survivor Series '91 review
Survivor Series '91 Review
1991 Survivor Series Results

External links
Official 1991 Survivor Series website

1991 in Michigan
Events in Detroit
1991
Professional wrestling in Detroit
1991 WWF pay-per-view events
November 1991 events in the United States